John Maynard (January 8, 1786 in Frederick County, Maryland – March 24, 1850 in Auburn) was an American lawyer and politician from New York.

Life
Maynard graduated from Union College, Schenectady, New York, in 1810. Then he studied law, and was admitted to the bar and commenced practice at Seneca Falls, New York. He was Clerk of Seneca County from 1821 to 1825.
He was a member of the New York State Assembly (Seneca Co.) in 1822.

Maynard was elected as an Adams man to the 20th United States Congress, holding office from March 4, 1827, to March 3, 1829. He was D.A. of Seneca County in 1836 and 1837. He was a member of the New York State Senate (7th D.) from 1838 to 1841, sitting in the 61st, 62nd, 63rd and 64th New York State Legislatures. He resigned his seat on March 4, 1841.

Maynard was elected as a Whig to the 27th United States Congress, holding office from March 4, 1841, to March 3, 1843.

He moved to Auburn, and was a justice of the New York Supreme Court (7th D.) from 1847 until his death. In 1850, he was ex officio a judge of the New York Court of Appeals.

Sources

External links

1850 deaths
Union College (New York) alumni
1786 births
New York (state) National Republicans
People from Frederick County, Maryland
Members of the New York State Assembly
New York (state) state senators
New York Supreme Court Justices
Judges of the New York Court of Appeals
National Republican Party members of the United States House of Representatives
Whig Party members of the United States House of Representatives from New York (state)
People from Seneca Falls, New York
19th-century American politicians
19th-century American judges